Jawory may refer to the following places:
Jawory, Greater Poland Voivodeship (west-central Poland)
Jawory, Pomeranian Voivodeship (north Poland)
Jawory, Szczecinek County in West Pomeranian Voivodeship (north-west Poland)